François-Raoul Larche (1860 in Saint-André-de-Cubzac – 1912 in Paris) was a French Art Nouveau sculptor whose work included several figures of Christ, but who may be better known for his numerous female figures, both nude and draped.

He was one of several artists inspired by the dancer Loie Fuller; one of his best-known statues depicts Fuller dancing with part of her drapery billowing above and behind her head like a flame.

Another well-known sculpture, Les Violettes, depicts a group of nude children with an older girl who may be their mother or older sister. Their bodies are entwined with flower stems and leaves and they are all wearing petal bonnets, suggesting that they are meant to represent the spirits of flowers.

External links

Gilded bronze electric lamp in the shape of the American dancer, Loie Fuller (National Gallery of Australia)
L'apotre (ewolfs.com)
Tempete et ses Nuees (iCollector.com)
Seated female nude (treadwaygallery.com)
Jesus as a boy (p4a.com)
Skinner Inc. catalogue with image of gilt Les Violettes statuette (pdf)
 Jeanne d'Arc, bergère
 

1860 births
1912 deaths
Art Nouveau sculptors
People from Gironde
20th-century French sculptors
19th-century French sculptors
French male sculptors
19th-century French male artists